Anoop Nautiyal is a social activist based in Dehradun, Uttarakhand. His work has focused on issues of environment and sustainable development of the state. He is the founder of Social Development Communities Foundation, an NGO and think tank based in Dehradun, which works works at the grassroots level for the empowerment of communities, as well as the sustainable development of the mountain state of Uttarakhand. He is a prolific social communicator and has also been a columnist for the Indian Express.

He had a brief foray in the political space and contested the 2017 Uttarakhand Legislative Assembly election.

Anoop Nautiyal attended Shri Ram College of Commerce and National Institute of Fashion Technology in New Delhi.

References

External links
Official website - Social Development Communities Foundation Website

People from Uttarakhand
Living people
Shri Ram College of Commerce alumni
National Institute of Fashion Technology alumni
Year of birth missing (living people)